Wu Chien-ho (born 2 May 1993) is a Taiwanese actor, best known for his role as Hong Cheng-yi in the PTS miniseries Days We Stared at the Sun. 

Wu graduated from the Chinese Culture University, where he majored in Chinese martial arts.

Wu won the Best Supporting Actor award at the Golden Bell Awards two years in a row with his first and second drama works.

Filmography

Film

References

External links 
  角色─洪 仔 (巫建和 飾)
 Golden Bell Awards Celebration Mixed

1993 births
Living people
21st-century Taiwanese male actors
Male actors from Taipei
Taiwanese male film actors
Taiwanese male television actors